St Andrew's Hospital is a leading psychiatric hospital in Northampton, England.

St Andrew's Hospital may also refer to various other hospitals, including:

 St. Andrew's Hospital, Beijing, China
 St Andrew's Hospital, Bow, London, UK
 St Andrew's Hospital, Dollis Hill, London, UK
 St Andrew's Hospital, Norwich, Norfolk, UK

See also 
 St. Andrew's (disambiguation)